The 800 Westchester Avenue complex is a postmodern Class A office building located in Rye Brook, New York. It was designed  by the architectural firm of Kevin Roche John Dinkeloo and Associates, LLC to serve as the corporate headquarters for  General Foods.

Described as an "aluminum business palace" and an "Aztec temple", it was also notable for being the subject of the largest real estate transaction of 2004.  


History

Originally conceived in 1979 by the General Foods company as a symbol of the firm's "aggressive consumer products packaging and marketing", it is known for its distinctive glass and white aluminum exterior.  Upon its opening in 1983, General Foods relocated 2,000 headquarters staff from nearby White Plains. However, in 1985, General Foods was acquired by Philip Morris, which proceeded to lay off most of that location's employees in 1987. Then in 1989 General Foods merged with Kraft Foods Inc. to form "Kraft General Foods" where it remained in its White Plains, NY Headquarters until the mid 1990s when it moved to Northfield Illinois.   

After a series of subsequent mergers and restructurings, Altria, the successor to Philip Morris, sold off its remaining interest in the facility in 2004 to the IJNR Group headed by Robert Weisz, moving the remaining 1,000 employees to other facilities except for 6 essential employees who remain employed with RPW in Westchester County.  At a cost of 40 million dollars, this was the largest real estate transaction in Westchester County in 2004 and did not include the 70 million dollar cost of renovating and subdividing the building.

Facilities
The complex is noted for its extensive corporate amenities, and retains such features as a hair salon, barber shop, television studio, fitness center and conference facilities.

Also on-site is the related 760 Westchester Avenue facility that has been converted into a disaster recovery/adjunct location.  It is currently leased by CBLPath Inc for an anatomic pathology services lab.

Currently, it is owned by the RPW Group and managed by Cushman and Wakefield.

In Media
The complex has also been featured in USA Network Drama Mr Robot Season 1 Episode 5 as the headquarters of the fictional company Steel Mountain a data security company.  Both interior and exterior scenes were shot on location including data center and the executive cafeteria.

References

Food and drink company headquarters in the United States
Rye, New York
Office buildings completed in 1983
Buildings and structures in Westchester County, New York
1983 establishments in New York (state)